Süleymanlı, also known as Zeitun, Zeytun, Zeytunfimis or Zeytünfimis, is a town in the Kahramanmaraş Province, Turkey.

The village has an ancient history as a center of settlement. The surface of the region has a very indented and protruding surface as it is cut by many streams with abundant water and strong flow. For this reason, the houses have an irregular appearance of leaning on steep slopes. The village had a population of 754 in 1997, 459 in 2000, and 1350 in 2007.

Name and Etymology
The name Zeitun comes from the Arabic word for olive. Another name for the town and the surrounding district used by Armenians is Ulnia. After the Turkish Government had already changed the towns name to Yeni Şehir (for New City), the town was renamed Süleymanlı on the 8 June 1915 after a Turkish military commander Süleyman Bey who was killed fighting Armenian resistance against the Armenian Genocide in the town in 1915.

History

According to folk tradition, Armenians first came to Zeitun from the medieval Armenian capital of Ani after its fall in 1064. The Armenians of Zeitun and the surrounding district historically enjoyed a high degree of autonomy owing to their defensible position in the mountains. This autonomy was acknowledged by an edict of the Ottoman Sultan Murad IV made in 1618, which gave the inhabitants a high degree of autonomy in exchange for a yearly tax. In the 19th century, Zeitun was one of the few places where a ruling Armenian nobility still existed, consisting of four ishkhans (barons or princes) ruling the town and the surrounding villages. According to one contemporary Armenian source, the town consisted of 1,500 homes inhabited by Armenians in 1900, while 24 Turkish families had lived in the town before leaving in 1896.

The inhabitants fought with Ottoman forces multiple times from 1780 to 1895 to preserve their autonomy. The most notable rebellions in the town occurred in 1862, 1895 and 1915. Although Ottoman forces were unable to capture the town during the 1862 rebellion, the residents of Zeitun were unable to preserve their traditional autonomy after the 1860s. The rebellion of 1895 was incited by revolutionaries of the Social Democrat Hunchakian Party, and was ended by the mediation of the European powers after four months of fighting. The 1915 rebellion, also led by the Hunchaks, occurred during the Armenian genocide. The town was captured and its inhabitants were deported to Syria.

Some Armenians returned to Zeitun during the occupation of Cilicia by the French army from 1918 to 1921. However, when the region was ceded back to Turkey, the Armenians were forced to flee once again.

Notable natives
 Smpad Piurad, Armenian intellectual, writer, and public activist

See also

First Zeitun Resistance
Zeitun Rebellion (1895–1896)
Zeitun Resistance (1915)

References 

Towns in Turkey
Populated places in Kahramanmaraş Province